WSVQ-LP (92.1 FM) is a radio station licensed to serve the community of Charleston West Side, West Virginia. The station is owned by the Partnership of African American Churches. It airs a variety radio format.

The station was assigned the WSVQ-LP call letters by the Federal Communications Commission on April 3, 2015.

References

External links
 Official Website
 

SVQ-LP
SVQ-LP
Radio stations established in 2017
2017 establishments in West Virginia
Variety radio stations in the United States
Kanawha County, West Virginia